"Body Talk" is a song written by Leon Berger and recorded by the Australian/New Zealand band Koo De Tah. It was released in November 1985 as the second single from the band's debut studio album, Koo De Tah. The peaked at number 27 on the Australian Kent Music Report.

Track listing
 7" Single (884 059-7)
 Side A "Body Talk" - 3:56
 Side B "My Eyes Are Shut"

 12" Single (884 059-1)
 Side A "Body Talk"   (Body Mix)  
 Side B "My Eyes Are Shut"

Charts

Weekly charts

References 

1985 songs
1985 singles
Songs written by Leon Berger